That's Love! is a British television sitcom about the domestic problems of a young married couple, lawyer Donald (Jimmy Mulville) and designer Patsy (Diana Hardcastle). The programme was produced by TVS and first broadcast on ITV between 1988 and 1992.

Four series were made, produced by Humphrey Barclay and directed by John Stroud. All 26 episodes were written by Terence Frisby, and it was executive produced by John Kaye Cooper, Sarah Lawson and Gill Stribling-Wright. There has been no domestic commercial release of the series on any format in the UK.

Plot
Series 1 and 2 are fairly straightforward sitcom fare, with very little in the way of story arcs or connecting episodes. Much of the comedic content is concentrated on Donald and Patsy continuing to learn about one another despite several years together. In the first episode, Donald discovers his wife has not told him the whole truth concerning her life before they married - specifically, how many previous sexual partners she has had. The last episode of the second series reveals that, despite appearances from their photograph album, Donald and Patsy are not actually married.

The third series focuses on an affair between Donald and his client Laurel (Liza Goddard), which unfortunately kicks off just after Patsy and Donald finally tie the knot, leading to their visiting a marriage guidance counsellor in the first episode of the fourth and final series. The counsellor, Tristan Beasley (Tony Slattery) falls in love with Patsy, and they embark on an affair, but Patsy, realising she won't feel the same way about Tristan, ends the relationship. In the final moment of the series, Patsy runs to Donald's arms, apologising to him for what she has done - it is left up to the viewer to decide whether the couple's marriage is doomed or they may be able to rescue their relationship.

Cast

Jimmy Mulville - Donald Redfern
Diana Hardcastle - Patsy Redfern
Liza Goddard - Laurel Manasotti (series 3)
Tony Slattery - Tristan Beasley (series 4)

Recurring cast
Phyllida Law - Babs
Ralph Nossek - Victor
Lynne Pearson - Amanda Owen
Rob Spendlove - Gary (series 1)
Neil Pearson - Gary (series 2-4)
Vivienne McKone - Olive (series 1-2)
Robin Meredith - Geoffrey (series 3)
Nicolas Colicos - Hank (series 3-4)
Zoe Hodges - Redfern child
Matt Cole - Redfern child
Matthew Perry - Owen child
Eleanor Puttock - Owen child
Lloyd Meikle - Owen child (series 1)
Romy Chasan - Owen child (series 1-2)
Alice May Wilkinson - Owen child (series 2)
Laura Elliott - Owen child (series 3)
Olivia Silver - Owen child (series 3)

References
Taylor, Rod (1994) The Guinness book of Sitcoms - Guinness. .
TV times magazine, 1992 (feature on the first episode of the fourth series).

External links
.
Guardian obituary of John Stroud.

ITV sitcoms
1988 British television series debuts
1992 British television series endings
1980s British sitcoms
1990s British sitcoms
Television shows produced by Television South (TVS)
English-language television shows